David Luther Roberts (born July 23, 1951) is an American retired pole vaulter and practicing physician. He won a silver medal at the 1971 Pan America Games and a bronze at the 1976 Olympics. Domestically he held the NCAA title in 1971–1973 and the AAU title in 1972 and 1974. He set two world records, in 1975 and 1976.

During the 1976 U.S. Olympic Trials, Roberts broke his pole. His rival and then world record holder Earl Bell lent him his pole, and Roberts won the Trials with a new world record of 5.70 m. At the Olympics, he and two other athletes cleared 5.50 m. He passed at 5.55 m and his rivals failed to clear that height. He was unable to clear the next height at 5.60 m, as it had begun to rain.  He finished third on the attempts count.

Roberts graduated from Rice University in 1974. He graduated from the University of Florida College of Medicine in 1979, and is currently an assistant clinical professor of emergency medicine at that institution.

References

1951 births
Living people
American male pole vaulters
Olympic bronze medalists for the United States in track and field
Athletes (track and field) at the 1976 Summer Olympics
Athletes (track and field) at the 1971 Pan American Games
Rice Owls men's track and field athletes
Rice University alumni
Track and field athletes from Oklahoma
World record setters in athletics (track and field)
Medalists at the 1976 Summer Olympics
Pan American Games medalists in athletics (track and field)
Pan American Games silver medalists for the United States
People from Stillwater, Oklahoma
Medalists at the 1971 Pan American Games